Ludwig Ross (22 July 1806, Bornhöved – 6 August 1859, Halle an der Saale) was a German classical archaeologist. He is chiefly remembered for the rediscovery and reconstruction of the Temple of Athena Nike in 1835–1836, and for his other excavation and conservation work on the Acropolis of Athens. He was also a significant figure in the early years of archaeology in the independent Kingdom of Greece, serving as Ephor General of Antiquities between 1834 and 1836.

As a representative of the Bavarocracy — the dominance by northern Europeans, especially Bavarians, of Greek government and institutions under the Bavarian-born King Otto — Ross attracted the enmity of the native Greek archaeological establishment. He was forced to resign as Ephor General over his delivery of the Athenian 'naval records', a series of inscriptions first unearthed in 1834, to the German August Böckh for publication. He was subsequently appointed as the first professor of archaeology at the University of Athens, but once again forced to resign by the nativist 3 September 1843 Revolution, which removed non-Greeks from public service in the country. He spent his final years as a professor in Halle, where he argued unsuccessfully against the reconstruction of the Indo-European language family, believing the Latin language to be a direct descendant of Greek.

Ross is credited with creating the foundations for the science of archaeology in independent Greece, and for establishing a systematic approach to excavation and conservation in the earliest days of the country's formal archaeological practice. His publications, particularly in epigraphy, were widely used by contemporary scholars, and his role at Athens in training the first generation of natively-trained Greek archaeologists was particularly significant for producing Panagiotis Efstratiadis, one of the foremost Greek epigraphers of the 19th century and a successor of Ross as Ephor General.

Early life

Ross was born in 1806 in Bornhöved in Holstein, then ruled by the Kingdom of Denmark. His paternal grandfather, a doctor, had moved from northern Scotland to Hamburg around 1750. His father, Colin Ross, married Juliane Auguste Remin. When Ludwig was four years old, his father moved to the Gut Altekoppel estate in Bornhöved, which he managed and later acquired. Their five sons and three daughters included Ludwig's younger brother, the painter Karl Ross. Ludwig, like his brother Karl, campaigned for the Duchy's independence from Denmark.

Ross grew up in Kiel and Plön. In 1825, he went to the Christian-Albrechts-Universität in Kiel to study classical philology. He graduated on 16 May 1829 with a Ph.D. on Aristophanes' Wasps, supervised by Nitzch, after which he worked briefly as a private tutor in Copenhagen. In 1831 he published his first scholarly work, a short history of the Duchy of Schleswig-Holstein.

In 1832, with Nitzch's support, Ross applied for and received a scholarship from the King of Denmark to travel in Greece. His letters of this period to Nitzsch reveal his intention to continue his studies of Aristophanes, and to publish academic work to build his scholarly reputation. After a brief visit to study in Leipzig, he made his way to Greece in 1832, travelling overland to Trieste before boarding a Greek ship, the Etesia, for Nafplio on 11 July.

Archaeological career in Greece (1832-1843)

Ross arrived in Greece on 26 July 1832, two weeks before the National Assembly confirmed the appointment of Otto of Bavaria as King of Greece. He was made deputy curator of antiquities at the Archaeological Museum of Nafplion, then capital of Greece, in 1832, and was received by the Greek National Assembly in the city on 8 August, presenting them with a lithograph of Otto which he had brought with him from Trieste.

Like many German archaeologists and scholars, Ross found favour with the young king, and Ross would later accompany Otto on archaeological travels around Greece. 
The three sub-ephors served under the Bavarian architect Adolf Weissenberg, who had been given overall responsibility as ephor for Greek antiquities.

Ross organised a series of sporting competitions, similar to the ancient Olympic and Isthmian Games, on 4 March 1833, and encouraged the Greek government, through the Royal Family, to issue an 1837 decree re-establishing the Olympic Games in Pyrgos.

Work on the Acropolis of Athens (1834-1836) 

In July 1834, the architect Leo von Klenze arrived in Athens to advise Otto on the development of the city, and advised that the Acropolis, which was at that point a military fortress occupied by Bavarian troops, should be demilitarised and designated as an archaeological site. A royal decree to this effect was issued on 18 August. Weissenberg's reputed lack of interest in antiquities, as well as his political opposition to the regent Josef Ludwig von Armansperg, led to his dismissal from office in September. On Klenze's personal recommendation, Ross was given the title of 'Ephor General' in charge of all archaeology in Greece on 10 September, which included direct responsibility for the Acropolis. Ross' control of the Acropolis passed over Pittakis, who had been serving since 1832 as the unpaid 'custodian of the antiquities in Athens', and into whose sub-ephorate Athens fell by the arrangement of 1833. In Athens, Ross worked mostly alongside architects from northern Europe, particularly the Prussian Eduard Schaubert, the Danish Christian Hansen (who replaced the Greek architect Stamatios Kleanthis on the latter's resignation, shortly after work began) and the Dresden native Eduard Laurent. The dominance of non-Greek scholars in the excavation and conservation of Greek monuments provoked resentment from the native Greek intelligentsia, and tensions between Pittakis and Ross.

Tension existed between the Greek state's aim of conserving Athens' ancient monuments, its existing role as a military fortification, and the needs of the expanding city of Athens. Klenze had envisaged that the area around the site would be kept clear of buildings, creating an 'archaeological park': however, the pressure on housing created by a growing population, as well as the generally chaotic nature of city government in this period, made this aim impossible. In 1834, Ross was asked to compose a list of sites around the Acropolis that were most in need of protection, so that they could be acquired by the state: working with Pittakis, he identified thirteen, but was initially forced to reduce the list to five, before the proposed initiative was abandoned altogether. In 1835, both in order to fund the restoration works and to control the number of visitors, the Acropolis became the first archaeological site in the world to charge an entrance fee. Ross' work was seen as part of the broader project of building Athens as the capital of the new Greek state: in 1835, Ross became a member, and subsequently the chair, of the building commission responsible for the planning of the city.

Ross' work on the Acropolis began in January 1835, and has been described as the first systematic excavation of the site. Klenze set out a series of principles for the restoration, which included the removal of any structures deemed to be of no 'archaeological, constructional or pictureseque' interest, reconstruction using fallen parts of the original monuments (anastylosis) as far as possible, and the placement of fragments deemed of aesthetic interest (but not sculptures, which were to be displayed in the mosque and Theseion) in 'picturesque piles' between the monuments. In the spring of 1835, Ross and Schaubert carried out rebuilding and restoration of the Theseion to make it suitable for its new role as a museum, which included the demolition of the apse constructed during the monument's use as a Christian church.

The initial works of 1835 focused on the Parthenon and on the western approach to the Acropolis, around the Pedestal of Agrippa and what was then known as the Tower of Athena Nike: the former parapet of the Temple of Athena Nike, most of which had been dismantled during the Venetian siege of 1687 and whose surviving parapet was serving as a gun emplacement. Ross hired eighty workmen, split between the two sites. The first tasks were to demolish the modern bastion near the Tower of Athena Nike and the mosque inside the Parthenon, which Ross justified in his letters to Klenze as necessary to prevent the re-militarisation of the Acropolis, both structures having previously been used by the military garrison. A lack of heavy lifting equipment limited Ross' progress in the Parthenon, making the full demolition of the mosque impossible, but the excavations revealed the first evidence for the Older Parthenon which predated the Periclean temple, as well as numerous fragments and items of statuary from the Classical temple.

At the Tower of Athena Nike, Ross' demolition of the bastion revealed the disiecta membra of the former temple, which has been described by Fani Mallouchou-Tufano as 'one of the greatest moments in the history of the Acropolis in this period'. Ross and his collaborators carried out the reconstruction of the temple between December 1835 and May 1836, building on top of the surviving crepidoma and column bases with the excavated fragments of the temple, which were placed with little regard for their individual situation, and other remains of nearby monuments, including the Propylaia. The restoration was hailed at the time as the first full reconstruction of a Classical monument in Greece, but later observers criticised the haste in which the work was undertaken, the incongruity of the use of modern materials where ancient fragments could not be found, and the lack of correspondence between Ross' reconstruction and any plausible original design of the temple. Throughout his excavations on the Acropolis, he published his results in both the academic press and in reports to German newspapers.
At a time when relatively few Greek archaeologists worked outside Athens, Ross organised archaeological collections throughout the Cyclades, and conducted excavations on Thera in 1835, unearthing twelve funerary inscriptions, which Ross divided between Thera, the regional museum on Syros (which he had ordered to be established in 1834–1835) and the Central Museum in Athens. He remained closely connected with the Ottonian court, and guided Otto's father Ludwig I of Bavaria and the Hermann, Fürst von Pückler-Muskau during their respective visits to Greece. He also corresponded closely with the British antiquarian William Martin Leake, who had travelled extensively through Greece in the early 19th century. Leake's final account of his travels, Travels in Northern Greece, was published in 1835 and became the period's standard introduction to the archaeology and topography of Greece.

'Naval Records Affair' and resignation as Ephor General

Ross had a long-running feud with Kyriakos Pittakis, one of the first native Greeks employed by the Greek Archaeological Service, which reflected wider tensions between native Greek archaeologists and the mostly Bavarian scholars who, on the invitation of King Otto, dominated Greek archaeology in the first years of the independent state. In 1834 and 1835, excavations in the Piraeus uncovered a series of inscriptions known as the 'Naval Records', which gave information on the administration and financing of the Athenian navy between the 5th and 4th centuries BCE. Ross studied the inscriptions and sent sketches to August Böckh for the Corpus Inscriptionum Graecarum, despite having not yet received approval to publish them. The Greek authorities asserted that Ross' actions were illegal: Pittakis attacked Ross in the press, forcing Ross' resignation as Ephor General in 1836. Nikolaos Papazarkadas has argued that Pittakis' opposition to Ross' actions was personal rather than principled, pointing out that Pittakis made no protest against the copying of several thousand Greek inscriptions by French epigraphers from 1843 onwards, a project supported by the Prime Minister, Ioannis Kolettis.

On Ross' resignation, Pittakis was appointed ephor of the 'Central Public Museum for Antiquities', making him the most senior archaeologist employed by the Greek Archaeological Service and its de facto head. He received the title of Ephor General in 1843.

Professorship at Athens (1837-1843) 

The regent Armansperg promised to restore Ross' status as Ephor General, but failed to do so, cooling relations between himself and Ross. When Otto came of age in 1837, however, he founded the Othonian University of Athens (now the National and Kapodistrian University of Athens), which was inaugurated on 3 May. Ross was granted the inaugural professorship of Archaeology, one of the first such chairs in the world. Ross' professorship has generally been attributed to Otto's personal favour towards him: it has even been suggested that the chair was created specifically for him. He was one of seven Germans out of 23 teaching staff, paid 350 drachmae a month.

Ross' first lecture took place on 10 May, on Aristophanes, before an audience of around 30. During his professorship, he lectured widely on Ancient Greek and Latin literature, on the history of Classical Athens and Sparta, and on the topography of Athens, largely basing his course on inscriptions that he had discovered himself. In the 1840–1841 academic year, Ross offered a course in Greek epigraphy, marking the first time that epigraphy had been taught as a distinct discipline in Greece. His students included the epigraphist and future Ephor General Panagiotis Efstratiadis.

Ross was elected as a member of the university's nine-member senate, where he supported the introduction of German-style assistant professors. In 1834, he published the first volume of Inscriptiones Graecae Ineditae, a compendium and edition of the Greek inscriptions he had discovered and the first epigraphical volume to be published in Greece. He was criticised on its publication for writing in Latin rather than Greek, which has been suggested as part of the reason why he delayed the publication of the second volume, which had been expected in 1835, until 1842. In 1839, he published the results of his excavations at the Temple of Athena Nike, in a volume illustrated by Hansen and Schaubert.In 1841, Ross published his Handbook of the Archaeology of the Arts, written in katharevousa Greek. Olga Palagia has described the Handbook as both 'a model of the scientific method for its time' and 'a monument to the Greek language'. In the volume, Ross promoted Neoclassicist ideals, by which he argued that art and architecture should adapt and imitate the models of Classical antiquity, placing comparatively little emphasis on historical questions about the development of Greek architecture. Ross also argued for the dependence of Ancient Greek culture on that of Egypt and the Ancient Near East, which contrasted with the then-fashionable view of Classical 'purity' advanced by Johann Joachim Winckelmann and his successors, such as Antoine-Chrysostome Quatremère de Quincy and Karl Bötticher.

During his tenure at Athens, Ross travelled widely throughout Greece, including a journey to Marathon in 1837 with his brother Charles and Ernst Curtius, the future excavator of Olympia. Alongside archaeology, he took an interest in modern Greek ethnography and folklore, including the spread of the Greek language, which he spoke sufficiently fluently that Greeks often mistook him for a native.  In the summer of 1837, he travelled through the Greek islands, visiting Sikinos, Sifnos, Amorgos, Kea, Kythnos, Santorini and Ios, accompanied by the surveyor Karl Ritter and publishing his explorations on Sikinos as Η Αρχαιολογία της Νήσου Σικίνου. His archaeological description of Sifnos was described, in 1956, as 'still the best account of the island we possess ... for more than a hundred years of archaeological research has still produced no better guide to the islands than Ross'.

He subsequently travelled through the Greek islands and Asia Minor, making him one of the first Europeans to explore the interior of Caria and Lycia, in 1841 and 1843, journeys which he later published as Reisen auf den griechischen Inseln des Ägäischen Meeres in 1843 and 1845. He took a leave of absence for about half of 1839 and all of 1842, during which he visited Germany, and did not teach at all during the academic year 1841–1842. He regularly accompanied King Otto on archaeological travels during his time at Athens.

Ross was appointed as a corresponding member of the Bavarian Academy of Sciences in 1837, having previously been named to the Prussian Academy of Sciences in 1836.

By the late 1830s, negative comments in the Greek press about the so-called 'Bavarocracy' had become common, and the dominance of northern Europeans in Greek academia, archaeology and architecture had become a source of considerable unrest. During his Aegean travels of 1843, Ross received news of the revolution of 3 September, which forced Otto to dismiss most of the non-Greeks in public service, including Ross. He was succeeded as professor of archaeology by Alexandros Rizos Rangavis in 1844.

Professorship at Halle (1843-1857)
Through the support of Humboldt, Ross was appointed to the professorship of archaeology at the University of Halle in the German state of Saxony, then ruled by Prussia. The beginning of his employment was delayed by Frederick William IV of Prussia, who granted him a two-year travel stipendium, allowing him to spend time in Smyrna, Trieste and Vienna. During the winter of 1844–1845, he organised excavations, led by Eduard Schaubert, near Olympia. The project was financed by the Prussian Ministry of Culture and the Prussian king Friedrich Wilhelm IV, to whom Ross' friend Alexander von Humboldt had introduced and recommended the project. Schaubert's excavations investigated a site reputed to be the grave of Coroebus of Elis, the supposed victor of the first Olympic Games in 776 BC, hoping to assess the origins of the Olympic Games and the historicity of Coroebus. The excavations were concluded in 1846, having found the remains of a grave of uncertain date, with traces of ashes, animal bones and pottery sherds, as well as bronze vessels and a bronze helmet, which Schaubert interpreted as remains of a hero cult on the site.

A man named 'L. Ross' was referenced by the Arabist Otto Blau as visiting Petra in 1845. While Blau describes 'Ross' as an Englishman, David Kennedy has argued that Blau may have mistaken the nationality of the Scottish-descended Ludwig Ross, which would make Ross one of the earliest scholars to visit the site.

Ross eventually took his chair in Halle in 1845. He was an isolated figure in German academia, partly due to his criticism of well-respected scholars like the philologist Friedrich August Wolf and the historian Barthold Georg Niebuhr, and partly due to his then-unfashionable emphasis upon the links between Greek and Near Eastern civilisation, which placed him in conflict with the views of Karl Otfried Müller, who had argued for the autochthonous nature of Ancient Greek culture. His views were, however, supported by Julius Braun in Germany and by Desiré-Raoul Rochette in Paris. During a debate at Halle over the layout of its museum of art, Ross proposed that exhibits should be displayed on four walls, giving equal prominence to Greece, Rome, Egypt and Asia.

He published the third volume of Inscriptiones Graecae Ineditae in 1845, and a treatise on the demes of Attica with his colleague Eduard Meier in 1846. In 1848, he published Italics and Greeks: Did the Romans Speak Sanskrit or Greek?, in which he argued that Latin was a linguistic descendant of Greek in the same way that the Romance languages are descended from Latin, rejecting the emerging discoveries in the field of Indo-European studies.

Ross intended to publish his excavations of the Parthenon and the area of the Propylaia, complementing his 1839 publication of the Temple of Athena Nike, but had been forced by 1855 to abandon the project, partly due to financial constraints and partly due to the difficulty of collaborating with his co-authors Hansen and Schaubert without being physically present in Greece. In addition, both Karl Otfried Müller (in 1843) and Philippe Le Bas (in 1847) had already published some of the discoveries from the Temple of Athena Nike, relying on drawings made by others.

Personal life, death and legacy

In the spring of 1847, Ross married Emma Schwetschke, daughter of the publisher . Shortly thereafter, he developed the beginnings of a health condition, which gradually reduced his strength and mobility and caused him increasing pain and discomfort. He attempted, unsuccessfully, to treat his condition with spa cures.

Ross died by suicide in 1859. He was buried in Bornhöved, alongside his brother, Charles, who had died of typhus the previous year.

Ross' reflections on his career in Greece, Erinnerungen und Mittheilungen aus Griechenland, were published posthumously in 1863, with a foreword by his friend Otto Jahn. In the volume, which consisted largely of Ross' diaries and letters from his time in Greece, Ross alleged that technological backwardness and governmental incompetence had held back the development of Greece, and criticised both Otto's government and native Greek politicians for their 'localism' and the alleged weakness and lethargy of the royal administration.

Ross has been praised as one of the greatest figures in Greek epigraphy and as an important force in its beginnings as an academic discipline. His work was used heavily by August Böckh in his own influential epigraphical works, a debt which Böckh acknowledged in the subtitle of his 1840 work Documents on the Maritime Affairs of the Athenian State: 'with eighteen panels, containing the copies made by Mr. Ludwig Ross.' While the execution of his restoration of the Temple of Athena Nike has been criticised, his excavation and restoration work has been praised for its systematic approach and for beginning a long trend of similar endeavours on the Acropolis. He has generally been viewed as a competent and successful Ephor General, whose service and resignation had significant consequences for the development of Greek archaeology.

Footnotes

Notes

References

Bibliography

 
 
 
 
 
 
 
 
 
 
 
 
 
 
 
 
 
 .

External links 
 

Classical archaeologists
German classical scholars
1859 deaths
1806 births
German people of Scottish descent
Archaeology of Greece
Ephors General of Greece